The 56th Annual Country Music Association Awards was held on November 9, 2022 at the Bridgestone Arena in Nashville, Tennessee. Luke Bryan hosted the ceremony for the second time, with Peyton Manning as his co-host. The ceremony was broadcast live on ABC and will be available to stream on Hulu.

Background
The eligibility period for the 56th CMA Awards is July 1, 2021 to June 30, 2022. On August 1, 2022 the CMA Announced that Luke Bryan is set to return as host for the second time and will be accompanied by first-time co-host and former NFL quarterback, Peyton Manning. Robert Deaton  is the executive producer and Alan Carter will direct the ceremony. Lainey Wilson leads in nominations with six, closely followed by Ashley McBryde, Carly Pearce and Chris Stapleton who each have five.

On October 27, it was announced that two-time CMA Entertainer of the Year Alan Jackson would be the recipient of the Willie Nelson Lifetime Achievement Award.

Winners and nominees
Nominees were announced on Wednesday, September 7, 2022.

International Awards

Performers 
The first wave of performers was announced on October 25, 2022. The second wave was announced on November 1, 2022.

Presenters 
The presenters for the 56th CMA awards were announced on November 3.

Rex Linn and Reba McEntire — Presented Song of the Year
Jeannie Seely — introduced Miranda Lambert
Little Big Town — introduced Wynonna Judd
Wynonna Judd — Presented Vocal Duo of the Year
Breland — Chevrolet promotion
Parker McCollum and Jordan Davis — Presented Vocal Group of the Year
Sarah Drew and Tyler Hubbard — Presented Single of the Year
Cole Hauser — Presented Album of the Year
Lady A — Presented New Artist of the Year
Lainey Wilson — Crown Royal and CreatiVets promotion
Lionel Richie — Presented Female Vocalist of the Year
Ben and Erin Napier — Presented Male Vocalist of the Year
Jessica Chastain and Michael Shannon — Presented Entertainer of the Year

Nominee milestones
Courtesy of Billboard.
 As the top nominee with six nods, Lainey Wilson becomes the fourth artist to receive six or more nominations as a first-time nominee. Wilson follows Glen Campbell (1968) and Brad Paisley (2000), who also had six in their first years, and Kacey Musgraves (2013) who had eight.
 With Carrie Underwood and Miranda Lambert's nominations for Entertainer of the Year, this is the first time that two female acts have been nominated in this category three years running since Reba McEntire and The Judds in 1986-88.
 Shane McAnally's Song of the Year nomination for "Never Wanted to Be That Girl" ties him for most nominations in that category with Alan Jackson, with both songwriters achieving ten nods.
 For the first time in CMA history, three of the five nominees in the Single of the Year category are collaborations. "Never Wanted to Be That Girl" by Carly Pearce and Ashley McBryde is also the second all-female collaboration to be nominated in this category, following "Does He Love You" by Reba McEntire and Linda Davis in 1994.
 Miranda Lambert remains the most nominated female artist in CMA history, with 61, and the third most nominated artist overall behind Alan Jackson (81) and George Strait (83). Lambert's sixth Album of the Year nomination for Palomino makes her the most nominated female artist in that category, overtaking McEntire, Underwood and Loretta Lynn who each have five.
 With 16 nods, Lambert and Underwood are tied for the third most nominations in the Female Vocalist of the Year category behind McEntire (18) and Martina McBride (17). Similarly, Lady A's 15th nomination for Vocal Group of the Year put them in joint third with The Statler Brothers and Diamond Rio behind Little Big Town (17) and Alabama (21) for most nominations in the category. Brooks & Dunn also extend their lead as the most nominated act in the Vocal Duo of the Year category, with 23 nominations.
 Paul Franklin continues to extend his streak as the most nominated musician in CMA history, receiving his 29th nomination in the Musician of the Year category. Despite his 30 nominations overall, Franklin is notable for having never won a CMA Award in any category.

Reception
The 56th CMA Awards averaged 7.57 million viewers during their live broadcast on ABC, up ten percent from the previous year's ceremony and becoming the most-watched show in its timeslot.

References

Country Music Association Awards
2022 awards in the United States
Country Music Association
CMA
Country Music Association Awards
November 2022 events in the United States
21st century in Nashville, Tennessee
Events in Nashville, Tennessee